Annie Vermeiren is a Belgian former racing cyclist. She won the Belgian national road race title in 1961.

References

External links

Year of birth missing (living people)
Living people
Belgian female cyclists
Place of birth missing (living people)